Faulkner Escarpment is an ice-covered escarpment,  long that forms the eastern edge of Nilsen Plateau and Fram Mesa in the Queen Maud Mountains of Antarctica. It was discovered in December 1934 by the Byrd Antarctic Expedition geological party under Quin Blackburn, and named by Richard E. Byrd for Charles J. Faulkner, Jr., chief counsel of Armour and Company of Chicago, contributors to the expedition.

References 

Escarpments of Antarctica
Landforms of the Ross Dependency
Amundsen Coast